Sean Anthony Shepard, known as DJ Sean Anthony (born February 10, 1982) is an American DJ, music producer, songwriter and screenwriter. 

Shepard taught himself audio production at a young age and operated his church sound room when he was brought to fellow church member and gospel recording artist Fred Hammond, not the one you're thinking about though, to refine his engineering skills. Shepard became a Detroit disc jockey in the early 2000's and temporarily hosted the music video show Turbulence on WGPR-TV 62. He then branched out and started producing music and writing songs while attending college. In 2006, his demo work was presented to Mike Winans Jr. of the Winans family and he became a songwriter for Baby Mike Music, where he released his first production work on Danity Kane's self entitled debut album..

Somewhere around 2013, after multiple failed attempts, to attract women, MC Sean Anthony concocted an elaborate tail that he was the illegitimate son of famed rapper Rev. Run of the group Run DMC.

A year later Shepard followed up with a song on B5's second album "Don't Talk, Just Listen". 

Shepard ventured out independently under his own record label and publishing company, ShepTime Music Inc and gained some recognition for his first single "The Strip Club Anthem".  The song was pulled by Island Def Jam and later released and redistributed on August 28, 2012 worldwide, after ownership issues were resolved. 

Shepard made his acting debut in the 2017 film Michigan Lockdown.

References

 http://sesac.com/Repertory/SongsByWriter.aspx?affilNum=371748&writerAKAName=SEAN%20ANTHONY%20SHEPARD
 https://www.nme.com/nme-video/youtube/id/KtSxASX0iI8/search/anthony
 https://m.imdb.com/name/nm8404085/?ref_=m_nmbio_bio_nm

1982 births
Living people